Franco Lovignana (born 22 November 1957) is the bishop of the Roman Catholic Diocese of Aosta. He is the first native-bishop of Aosta since 1968.

Biography 

He entered the seminary in Aosta in 1971 and was ordained priest in 1981. In 1983 he obtained a degree in Sacred Theology at the Pontifical University of St. Thomas Aquinas.

From October 1984 to 2005, he was a professor of theology at the seminary of Aosta. Since October 1995, he was the episcopal vicar for the pastoral and canonic of collegiate of Saints Peter and Ursus of Aosta since 29 April 2003, prior of the same church. Since 2004 he was appointed vicar general of the diocese of Aosta.

References

Resources
 Profile of Mons. Lovignana on Catholic-Hierarchy
 Official page of diocese of Aosta

1957 births
Living people
Bishops of Aosta
20th-century Italian Roman Catholic bishops
People from Aosta